Revillon Frères (Revillon Brothers) was a French fur and luxury goods company, founded in Paris in 1723. Then called la Maison Givelet, it was purchased by Louis-Victor Revillon in 1839 and soon, as Revillon Frères, became the largest fur company in France. Branches were opened in London in 1869 and in New York in 1878.
At the end of the 19th century, Revillon had stores in Paris, London, New York City, and Montreal. 

Through its fur buying bureau in Leipzig, Germany (1876), and an agency in Moscow (1905), the company bought most of its furs from the markets of Moscow, Leipzig and at the annual fairs in Nizhny Novgorod (Gorki) at the Makaryev Fair and in Irbit at the Irbit Fair.

From 1908-1909 Revillon Frères opened fur trading posts in Siberia, Mongolia and Turkestan. By 1912 Revillon Frères had 125 fur trading posts in America and Siberia.

In the 1960s, Revillon acquired Grauer Furs, New York's preeminent fur manufacturing company. Grauer Furs was founded by Austrian immigrant William Grauer and later operated by Grauer's two sons, Abraham and Herman. In 1970, in a deal negotiated by Herman Grauer, Revillon became the fur supplier to Saks 5th Avenue. This arrangement lasted until 1995.

In 1982, Revillon was acquired by hypermarket operator Cora, and became its luxury division Cora-Revillon. Subsequently, Cora-Revillon became a separate company, now privately owned, with Revillon as its primary brand. Besides furs, Revillon produces perfume.

Fur trading operation in Canada (1893-1936)

 
In 1899 Revillon Frères opened a wholesale warehouse in Edmonton, Alberta and by 1903 had 23 stores across Canada. Owned by Victor Revillon, Revillon Frères eventually set up a network of fur-trading posts in northern Canada in direct competition with the Hudson's Bay Company (HBC) composed of an eastern division and a western division.

The western division included posts mostly in northern Alberta, Saskatchewan and Manitoba. In 1911 the company had 13 posts north and west of Athabasca Landing. Having acquired a depot in Prince Albert in 1904 they had an additional 10 posts from The Pas to Brochet and Nueltin Lake at the edge of the tundra.

The eastern division was in the region of James Bay and Ungava Bay in the north of Quebec which was served by their own fleet of ships. By 1909, Revillon had forty-eight stores in its Eastern Arctic division while HBC had fifty-two. Many of the Inuit villages in Nunavik, in northern Quebec, Canada, are located on sites originally occupied by Revillon Frères trading posts.

It was incorporated in Canada in 1912 as the Revillon Frères Trading Company Ltd.. In 1926 the Hudson's Bay Company bought 54% of the fur trade company and by 1936 the company was fully owned by the HBC. In 1938 the name was changed to Rupert's Land Trading Company.

Revillon Frères financed Robert Flaherty's 1922 film Nanook of the North, filmed near one of their trading posts at Inukjuak, Quebec on northeastern Hudson Bay, said to be Canada's first documentary.

Ilya Andreyevich Tolstoy, the grandson of count Leo Tolstoy, stayed at the Revillon Frères Post of Windy Lake on Nueltin Lake in the winter of 1928-1929. He was in a group attempting to get film footage of the migrating caribou for the William Douglas Burden and William C. Chanler's production, The Silent Enemy, one of the last and greatest of the silent films, released in 1930.

The Glenbow Museum located in Calgary has a collection of over 300 photographs of the Revillon posts, ships and items sold in their stores. Many of the photographs were taken by Samuel Herbert Coward the director of the Revillon Frères Trading Company Ltd. in Canada from 1904 to 1931. 
There is a Revillon Frères Museum in Moosonee, Ontario which has been closed for several years.

Revillon Posts in Canada

Western division
Edmonton, Alberta had a major store and warehouse and was the headquarters and distribution centre for the following posts. 
Athabasca Landing, Alberta
Grande Prairie, Alberta
Lesser Slave Lake, Alberta
Spirit River, Alberta
Sturgeon Lake (Alberta)
Peace River Crossing, Alberta
Peace River, Alberta
Fort Vermilion, Alberta
Prairie Lake, Alberta
Keg River, Alberta
Wabiscond
Trout Lake, Alberta
Hay River, Northwest Territories
Fort St. John, British Columbia
Prince Albert, Saskatchewan had a major store and was the headquarters for the following posts.
 Buffalo River, Saskatchewan see Dillon, Saskatchewan
Clear Lake see Birch Narrows First Nation
Montreal Lake, Saskatchewan
La Ronge, Saskatchewan
Stanley Mission, Saskatchewan
Île-à-la-Crosse, Saskatchewan
 Souris River see Pinehouse, Saskatchewan
Green Lake, Saskatchewan
La Loche, Saskatchewan
Pelican Narrows, Saskatchewan
Cumberland House, Saskatchewan
Pukatawagan, Manitoba
South Deer Lake at Southend, Saskatchewan
The Pas (closed 1923)
Brochet, Manitoba
Windy Lake Nueltin Lake
Casimir (Kasmere Lake)

Eastern division
Montreal had a major store and was the headquarters and distribution centre for the following posts located on James Bay, Hudson Bay and Labrador (list is incomplete). A fleet of ships, mostly schooners, were purchased to serve these posts.
Kamousitchonan Lake, James Bay area, Quebec
Wakeham Bay, Hudson Straight, Quebec
Fort Chimo, Ungava Bay, Hudson Straight, Quebec
Stratton Island, James Bay, Quebec
Port Harrison, Hudson Bay, Quebec
Fort George, James Bay, Quebec
Cape Dufferin, Quebec
Port Harrison, Quebec
Nemiscau, Quebec
Rupert House, Quebec
Wakeham Bay, Quebec
Kuujjuarapik, Quebec Whale River
Veenisk
Attawapiskat First Nation, Ontario
Fort Albany, Ontario
Porcupine City, Ontario
Moose Factory, Ontario Moosonee
Matheson, Ontario
Pagwa River, Ontario
English River, Ontario

Revillon boats

Stord steamer
Violet
Adventure steamer 2,500 tons
Albert Revillon three mast schooner 
Jean Revillon renamed Fort James (First ship to circumnavigate North American continent, 1928-29. Owned by Albert and Jean Revillon)
Emilia schooner
Annie E. Geele schooner
Albany power boat

Gallery

References

External links
"Fragments of Lost History" National Film Board of Canada Catalogue Number: NFB519970

Fur trade
Defunct companies of Quebec
Hudson's Bay Company